Mulla Muzaffar Husayn Kashani was an Iranian philosopher and poet who lived around 1700 AD. His life and works were studied by Aqa Bozorg Tehrani.

Life and works
Kashani wrote works on Plato, Aristotle, and Mulla Sadra.

References

 Aqa Bozorg Tehrai, Azzariah about Shiite writing, vol: 9. p. 1061

18th-century Iranian philosophers